Norford is a surname. Notable people with the surname include:

 Brian Norford (born 1932), British-Canadian geologist and paleontologist
 Donald Norford, Bermudian cricketer
 Patricia Norford (born 1932), Australian fencer
 William Norford (1715–1793), English medical practitioner and writer